Luis Antônio da Rocha Júnior (born 6 July 1997), known as Juninho Capixaba, is a Brazilian footballer who plays as a left back for Red Bull Bragantino.

Club career

Bahia
Born in Cachoeiro do Itapemirim, Espírito Santo, Juninho finished his formation with Bahia. He made his first team debut on 7 November 2015, starting in a 2–1 home loss against Santa Cruz for the Série B championship.

Juninho did not feature in any league matches during the 2016 campaign, which ended in promotion, and mainly appeared for the under-20 squad. Ahead of the 2017 season, he faced competition with new signings Matheus Reis and Pablo Armero, starting the year as a third-choice.

Juninho made his Série A debut on 6 August 2017, coming on as a second-half substitute for Armero in a 2–1 home win against São Paulo. He finished the tournament with 17 appearances, being an undisputed starter during the final stages.

Corinthians
On 5 January 2018, Juninho signed a four-year contract with Corinthians, mainly as a replacement to Sevilla-bound Guilherme Arana.

Grêmio
Juninho was loaned out to Grêmio in July 2018 for a fee of 1.3 millioner euros. On 16 May 2019, the deal was turned permanent.

Honours
Bahia
Copa do Nordeste: 2017
Campeonato Baiano: 2020

Corinthians
Campeonato Paulista: 2018

Fortaleza
Copa do Nordeste: 2022
Campeonato Cearense: 2022

References

External links

1997 births
Living people
Sportspeople from Espírito Santo
Brazilian footballers
Association football defenders
Campeonato Brasileiro Série A players
Campeonato Brasileiro Série B players
Esporte Clube Bahia players
Sport Club Corinthians Paulista players
Grêmio Foot-Ball Porto Alegrense players
Fortaleza Esporte Clube players
Red Bull Bragantino players